Tarakan People's Representative Council is a legislative body of Tarakan city. As of 2019, it has 30 representatives from 12 political parties.

References 

Tarakan
North Kalimantan